The Maraekakaho River is a river of the Hawke's Bay region, New Zealand. It flows into the Ngaruroro River.

See also
List of rivers of New Zealand

References

Rivers of the Hawke's Bay Region
Rivers of New Zealand